Blastania is a genus of flowering plants belonging to the family Cucurbitaceae.

Its native range is Tropical and Southern Africa, Madagascar, Arabian Peninsula, Indian subcontinent.

Species:

Blastania cerasiformis 
Blastania garcinii 
Blastania lucorum

References

Cucurbitaceae
Cucurbitaceae genera
Taxa named by Theodor Kotschy
Taxa named by Johann Joseph Peyritsch